Yuzhny  is an urban-type settlement in Barnaul urban okrug, Altai Krai, Russia. The population was 19,799 as of 2016.

Geography 
Yuzhny is located 15 km south of Barnaul (the district's administrative centre) by road. Ponomarevka is the nearest rural locality.

References 

Urban-type settlements in Altai Krai